Mechanics' institutes were a Victorian-era institution set up primarily to provide adult education, particularly in technical subjects, to working-class men, which spread to the corners of the English-speaking world, including the Australian colonies, where they were set up in virtually every colony. In some places, notably throughout the colonies of Queensland and New South Wales, they were often known as schools of arts.

Most institutes incorporated a library, and many of the old institutes evolved into public lending libraries, while others were converted for other uses or demolished to make way for modern buildings. This article includes a list of many past mechanics' institutes / schools of arts.

Background

The foundations of the movement which created mechanics' institutes were in lectures given by George Birkbeck (1776–1841). His fourth annual lecture attracted a crowd of 500, and became an annual occurrence after his departure for London in 1804, leading to the eventual formation on 16 October 1821 of the first mechanics' institute in Edinburgh, the Edinburgh School of Arts (later Heriot-Watt University). Its first lecture was on chemistry, and within a month it was subscribed to by 452 men who each paid a quarterly subscription fee. This new model of technical educational institution gave classes for working men, and included libraries as well as apparatus to be used for experiments and technical education, and by 1900 there were over 9,000 mechanics institutes around the world.

Mechanics' Institutes were sometimes called schools of arts in the Australian colonies, especially Queensland. The purpose of forming such institutes was to improve the education of working men, and to instruct them in various trades. They were also part of a wider 19th-century movement promoting popular education in Britain, at which time co-operative societies, working men's colleges and the university extension movement were established. The call for popular education in turn can be contextualised within the broader liberal, laissez-faire, non-interventionist philosophy which dominated British social, economic and political ideologies in the 19th century. In this environment, mechanics' institutes flourished as a means by which working men might improve their lot, either through self-education using the reading rooms in the institutes, or by participating in instructional classes organised and funded by institute members.

In Australia, mechanics' institutes were often run by the middle classes. The provision of reading rooms, museums, lectures and classes were still important, but the Australian institutions were also more likely to include a social programme in their calendar of events.

The first mechanics' institute in the Australian colonies was established in Hobart in 1827, followed by the Sydney Mechanics' School of Arts in 1833, Newcastle School of Arts in 1835, then the Melbourne Mechanics' Institute established in 1839 (renamed the Melbourne Athenaeum in 1873). From the 1850s, mechanics' institutes quickly spread throughout Victoria wherever a hall, library or school was needed. Over 1200 mechanics' institutes were built in Victoria but just over 500 remain today, and only six still operated their lending library services as of 2010.

21st century revival
Across the world, there is a move to sustain and revive mechanics' institutes and related institutions such as athenaeums and schools of art, as subscription libraries, sometimes incorporating or expanding their earlier functions. There have been several worldwide conferences between 2004 and 2021, known as the Mechanics' Worldwide Conference, of representatives of, or people who have an interest in, mechanics' institutes.

In the state of Victoria, a group of Mechanics' Institute representatives met in April 1998 at the institute in Kilmore to exchange information and ideas about the future of their organisations, at a conference entitled Mechanics' Institutes: The Way Forward. From this arose an association, the Mechanics' Institutes of Victoria, whose aim it is for mechanics' institutes to again play an important social and cultural role in their communities, as they did in the past. Mackay School of Arts

By state

New South Wales 

The Sydney Mechanics' School of Arts, established in 1833, is the oldest school of arts in continuous operation, and largest in Australia Other institutes in New South Wales include:

 Albury Mechanics' Institute, Albury
 Arncliffe School of Arts hall/Council Hall
 Balmain Workingmen's Institute closed
 Bathurst School of Arts
 Batlow Literary Institute
 Berry School of Arts
 Binalong Mechanics' Institute
 Blacktown School of Arts, established as the Blacktown Mutual Improvement Association (1905)
 Bourke School of Arts
 Braidwood Literary Institute
 Burrawang School of Arts
 Buxton, New South Wales
 Carlingford Mechanics' Institute
 Carlton School of Arts
 Cathcart Literary Institute
 Clarencetown School of Arts
  Mechanic Institute Hall, Cookamidgera
 Cronulla School of Arts 
 Epping School of Arts, Epping, New South Wales
 Fairfield School of Arts
 Glebe School of Arts
 Glen Oaks School of Arts
 Goulburn Mechanics' Institute (1853–1946)
 Grafton School of Arts Library
 Granville School of Arts, now a college
 Grenfell Mechanics' Institute, Grenfell
 Guildford Soldiers' Memorial School of Arts
 Gundagai Literary Institute, Gundagai
 Howlong Mechanics' Institute
 Kogarah School of Arts (1886)
 Lawson Mechanics' Institute
 Leichhardt School of Arts hall Hall
 Moruya Mechanics' Institute
 Nelligen Mechanics' Institute, Nelligen
 Newtown School of art
 Oatley School of Arts (1905), Oatley
 Peakhurst School of Arts, Peakhurst
 Penrith School of Arts
 Queanbeyan School of Arts
 Richmond School of Arts 
 Rockdale School of Arts 
 Rollands Plains
 Rooty Hill School of Arts (1903)
 Rozelle Mechanics' Institute
 St Albans School of Arts hall
 Scone School of Arts, Scone
 Seaham School of Arts
 Singleton Mechanics' Institute
 Sunny Corner School of Arts, Sunny
 Tenterfield School of Arts
 Wagga Wagga School of Arts
 Wentworth Falls School of Arts
 Wilberforce
 Windsor School of Arts, Bridge Street, Thompson Square
 Wingello Mechanics' Institute
 Yass Mechanics' Institute, Yass

Queensland 

 Baree School of Arts
 Brisbane School of Arts
 Bundaberg School of Arts
 Cairns School of Arts (now the Cairns Museum)
 Coorparoo School of Arts
 Eumundi School of Arts (now the Eumundi and District Historical Association)
 Gympie School of Arts (now the Gympie Regional Gallery)
 Herberton School of Arts
 Old Ipswich Town Hall
 Irvinebank School of Arts Hall
 Mackay School of Arts
 Maryborough School of Arts
 Mungungo School of Arts
 Numinbah Valley School of Arts
 Ravenswood School of Arts
 Rockhampton School of Arts
 Townsville School of Arts
 Woody Point Memorial Hall
 Yangan School of Arts

South Australia 

There were two iterations of the Adelaide Mechanics' Institute in Adelaide, South Australia. The first was based on the traditional working-men's educational model (founded 1838; merged with Adelaide Literary and Scientific Association and Mechanics' Institute in 1839, folded 1844). The second was led by schoolteacher W.A. Cawthorne, founded in 1847, This organisation merged with the South Australian Library in 1848, creating the Mechanics' Institute and South Australian Library. and was the forerunner of the State Library of South Australia, the South Australian Museum, and the Art Gallery of South Australia.

Between 1847 and 1856, thirteen further institutes came into existence:

Hindmarsh
North Adelaide
Stepney / Norwood
Glen Osmond
Gawler
Gawler
Mount Barker
Clarendon
Willunga
Woodside
Port Adelaide Institute
Port Lincoln
Port Elliot

The South Australian Institute, incorporated under the South Australian Institute Act of 1856, became the support and lead organisation for the 350 institutes in South Australia. In 1975, the state government phased out funding for the institutes, replacing them with free school-community libraries, while local public libraries were supported by local governments. The Institutes Association ceased to exist in 1988; however, most of the old institute buildings remain, many as heritage-listed buildings.

Later mechanics' institutes in South Australia included:

Balaklava Institute 
Beachport Institute
Cambrai Institute
Cobdogla Institute
Coonalpyn Institute
Curramulka Institute
Dawson Institute
 Dublin Institute
Edithburgh Institute
Farrell Flat Institute
Freeling Institute
Hamley Bridge Institute
Karoonda
 Kensington and Norwood Institute
Macclesfield Institute
Mannum Institute
Mintaro Institute
Mitcham Village Institute
Morgan Institute
Mount Gambier Institute
Owen Institute
Pinnaroo Institute
Port Vincent Institute
Ramco Institute
Saddleworth Institute
Stansbury Memorial Institute
Terowie Institute 
Waikerie Institute
Wasleys Institute

Tasmania 
The earliest and most prominent institute ïn Tasmania was Van Diemen's Land Mechanics' Institution, also known as Hobart Town Mechanics' Institute, Hobart (1827–1871), co-founded by George Augustus Robinson. The institute had a shaky start, but after the Presbyterian minister John Lillie became president in 1839, his lectures became very popular, described as "the high-water mark of learning publicly disseminated in the colony". However, it was not attended by working-class men, as the institute had gained a reputation for elitism and paternalism. After going bankrupt, it folded in 1871.
Launceston Mechanics' Institute, Launceston, co-founded in 1842 by Congregational minister, journalist and historian John West and designed by eminent New Zealand-born architect W. H. Clayton, was a very successful institute. When it was demolished in 1971, its books were given to the public library.

Others included:
 Don Mechanics' Institute, Don, Tasmania
 Ellesmere Mechanics' Institute, Ellesmere (later Scottsdale)
 Emu Bay Mechanics' Institute, Burnie
 Franklin Mechanics' Institute, Franklin
 Huon Mechanics' Institute
 Port Esperance Mechanics' Institute, Port Esperance
 Queenstown Mechanics' Institute, Queenstown
 Ringarooma Mechanics' Institute, Ringarooma
 Waratah Mechanics' Institute, Waratah
 West Hobart Mechanics' Institute, West Hobart, still standing as of 2011

There were other similar institutions, although not called mechanics' institutes, but with similar aims, at Bellerive, Campbell Town, Devon, Glenora, Green Ponds, Hamilton-on-Forth, Lefroy, Oatlands, Sorell, Stanley and Wynyard; and the Tasmanian Society for the Diffusion of Useful Knowledge (Launceston, 1831), the Tasmanian Society for the Acquisition of Useful Knowledge (Hobart Town, 1845), and the Mechanics' School of Arts (Hobart Town, 1850) were also focused on providing similar educational functions.

Most of the institutes in Tasmania became social and cultural centres for the middle classes, including women. Over time, musical performances and various entertainments, such as penny readings took precedence over lectures, and their original educational aims were forgotten. Many of the buildings have however survived, now used as community centres or libraries.

Victoria 

Many mechanics' institutes, athenaeums, schools of arts and related institutions are well documented by the Mechanics' Institutes of Victoria, Inc., whose members range from the well-resourced Melbourne Athenaeum to the tiny Moonambel Mechanics' Institute in Moonambel.

Past and present institutes in Victoria include:

 Alexandra School of Arts, Alexandra, Victoria
 Amphitheatre Mechanics' Institute, Amphitheatre
 Ballan Mechanics' Institute, 1860
 Ballarat Mechanics Institute
 Berwick Mechanics Institute and Free Library (1862)
 Bonnie Doon Community Centre
 Briagolong Mechanics' Institute, Briagolong, 1874
 Brunswick, Victoria Mechanics Institute
 Bunyip Mechanics' Institute, 1905
 Footscray Mechanics' Institute, Footscray
 Burke and Wills Institute, Fryerstown
 Glengarry Mechanics' Institute, 1886
 Horsham, Mechanics Institute
 Geelong Mechanics Institute
 Kilmore Mechanics' Institute and Free Library
 Kyneton Mechanics Institute
 Lancefield Mechanics' Institute and Free Library
 Little River Mechanics' Institute, Little River
 Long Gully Mechanics Institute
 Longwarry Mechanics’ Institute and Free Library, 1886
 Maffra Mechanics' Institute
 Maldon Athenaeum Library
 Malmsbury Mechanics’ Institute, 1862
 Meeniyan Mechanics’ Institute, 1892
 Melbourne Athenaeum Library
 Melbourne Mechanics Institute now part of the State Library of Victoria
 Prahran Mechanics' Institute, the only Mechanics' Institute in Victoria which has its own Act of Parliament for its incorporation.
 Port Fairy Library and Lecture Hall, Port Fairy, 1860
 Rosedale Mechanics’ Institute, 1863
 Rushworth Mechanics Institute
 Stanley Athenaeum and Public Room
 Stratford Mechanics’ Institute, 1866
 Talbot Community Library & Arts Centre
 Wiiliamstown Mechanics Institute
 Tallarook Mechanics Institute
 Trafalgar Mechanics’ Institute and Free Library, Trafalgar, 1889
 Toongabbie Mechanics’ Institute, 1883
 Upper Maffra Mechanics Institute
 Charlton, Mechanics Institute
 Drysdale Free Library
 Elmhurst Mechanics Institute
 Echuca Mechanics' Institute, Victoria
 Great Western Mechanics Institute
 Healesville Mechanics Institute
 Leongatha Mechanics Institute
 Lilydale Mechanics Institute
 Mornington Mechanics Institute
 Morongla Creek Mechanics Institute Hall
 Murrumburrah#gallery Institute
 Macarthur, Victoria Mechanisc Institute Hall
 Nagambie Mechanics Institute
 Riddells Creek Mechanics Institute
 Narre Warren Mechanics Institute (1891)
 Prahran Mechanics' Institute
 Purlewaugh Mechanics' Institute
 Purnim Mechanics' Institute, Purnim
 Mechanics' Institute, Sorrento
 Romsey Mechanics Institute
 Richmond School of Arts
 Guildford Soldiers Memorial School of Arts
 Cronulla School of Arts
 Carlton School of Arts hall
 Sunny Corner School of Arts.
 Cookamidgera Mechanics Institute.
 Warrandyte Mechnanics' Institute, Warrandyte
 Wambat Mechanics Institute
 Winiam, Shire of Lowan Mechanis Institute Library
 Woodend Mechanics Institute
 Yandoit Mechanics Institute

Western Australia 

The Swan River Mechanics' Institute, situated in Perth, was the first such organisation formed in the colony on 21 January 1851, followed by the Fremantle Mechanics Institute on 8 August 1851.

Other mechanics' institutes include:
Albany (1853)
 Bunbury (1867)
 Busselton (1861)
 Greenough (1865)
 Guildford Mechanics' Institute, Guildford, a suburb of Perth (1862)
 Katanning Mechanics' Institute, Katanning
 Northam (1866)
 South Perth Mechanics' Institute, now Old Mill Theatre, South Perth, 1899
 Toodyay (1866)
 York in 1861

References 

Libraries in Australia
Adult education in Australia